The Brazil Open or Aberto do Brasil is an annual golf tournament held in Brazil. It was founded in 1945 and was an event on the Tour de las Américas on several occasions, most recently in 2005. It is now an event on PGA Tour Latinoamérica.

History 
Until the early 1980s, the tournament was a popular stop for many of the world's top professionals, and can boast major winners Sam Snead, Billy Casper, Gary Player, Raymond Floyd, Jerry Pate and Hale Irwin in addition to superstars of South American golf, Roberto De Vicenzo and Ángel Cabrera, amongst its list of champions.

The most successful player remains Mário Gonzalez, who won a total of eight titles, including seven out of nine between 1946 and 1955 (no tournament was held in 1947).

As part of the celebrations of the 500 year anniversary of the discovery of Brazil by Pedro Álvares Cabral, in 2000 the European Tour included the São Paulo and the Rio de Janeiro 500 Year Opens on their schedule. The following year the São Paulo event was again included on the European calendar, and somewhat confusingly titled the São Paulo Brazil Open.

Winners

References

External links
Coverage on the PGA Tour Latinoamérica's official site

Golf tournaments in Brazil
PGA Tour Latinoamérica events
Former Tour de las Américas events
Recurring sporting events established in 1945
1945 establishments in Brazil